Remora is a genus of remoras native to temperate to tropical marine waters worldwide.

Species
The currently recognized species in this genus are:

References

 
Taxa named by Theodore Gill
Marine fish genera